Dromgoole is a surname. Notable people with the surname include:

Dominic Dromgoole (born 1964), English theatre director, and brother of Jessica 
Jessica Dromgoole, English theatre director, and sister of Dominic
George Dromgoole (1797–1847), politician and lawyer from Virginia
Thomas Dromgoole, Irish physician
Will Allen Dromgoole (1860–1934), Tennessee author and poet